Eva Belle Morrison Abdou (March 8, 1911 – March 17, 1985) was a Boston hospital librarian, and a long distance swimmer who made three attempts to cross the English Channel. She was on the Board of Governors of The International Professional Swimmers' Association.

Biography
She was born on March 8, 1911, in Pictou, Nova Scotia. in Pictou, Nova Scotia, Canada.

Eva completed her first 5-mile swim in 1918. In 1926 she lost the Boston Light swim after swimming for over 7 hours in frigid water. She was the last competitor to drop out of the race.

She attempted to swim the English Channel in 1927. She made another attempt on August 23, 1935.

She won the 1935 Dover Trophy with a time of 15 hours and 55 minutes for the 18-mile swim from Folkestone to Margate. On 9 October 1941 she was in a car accident in Wiscasset, Maine that killed Michael Tonely, her swimming coach and trainer. Mr. Tonely is the gentleman sitting in the middle of the boat of the accompanying Library of Congress photograph.

She died on March 17, 1985, in Brockton, Massachusetts.

External links
Eva Morrison

References

Female long-distance swimmers
1911 births
1985 deaths